Marcos García Fernández (born 4 December 1986) is a Spanish professional road bicycle racer, who currently rides for UCI Continental team .

Career
On the fourth stage of the 2012 Vuelta a España, he put on a great performance by finishing fourth of the mountain stage, taking first place of his group. He exulted on the finish line, throwing kisses to the crowd; he thought he had won, but he had not, as three escapees had crossed the line before him.

He has competed in four Grand Tours; three Vuelta a Españas and a Giro d'Italia.

Major results

2006
 1st Stage 6 
2007
 1st Overall 
1st Stage 2
 1st Stage 4 
 3rd Overall Bizkaiko Bira
2008
 1st Overall Bizkaiko Bira
 3rd Circuito Deputación de Pontevedra
2010
 2nd Gran Premio de Llodio
 3rd Vuelta a La Rioja
 7th Overall Tour of Slovenia
 7th Subida al Naranco
2011
 3rd Gran Premio de Llodio
 9th Road race, National Road Championships
2013
 6th Vuelta a la Comunidad de Madrid
 8th La Roue Tourangelle
 9th Prueba Villafranca de Ordizia
 10th Overall Vuelta a Asturias
2014
 2nd Overall Vuelta a Castilla y León
 9th Giro dell'Emilia
2015
 4th Overall Vuelta a Asturias
 7th Overall Vuelta a la Comunidad de Madrid
 10th Clássica Loulé
2016
 2nd Overall Tour of Japan
 3rd Oita Cycle Road Race
 7th Overall Tour de Singkarak
 10th Overall Tour de Kumano
2017
 1st Overall Tour de Hokkaido
1st Stage 3
 1st Stage 7 Tour of Japan
 3rd Overall Tour de Kumano
2018
 1st  Overall Tour of Japan
1st Stage 6
 8th Overall Tour de Kumano
2019
 1st  Overall Tour of Peninsular
1st  Mountains classification
1st Stage 4
 1st Mountains classification Tour de Kumano
 2nd Overall Tour of Thailand
 10th Overall Tour de Ijen
2021
 10th Road Race, National Road Championships
2022
 3rd Overall Tour de Taiwan
 7th Overall Tour de Hokkaido

References

External links
Caja Rural profile

Spanish male cyclists
1986 births
Living people
People from Cuenca del Alberche
Cyclists from the Community of Madrid